David Maisel is an American film and Broadway producer, entertainment businessman and the architect of the self-financed and self-producing Marvel Studios. He is the executive producer of Iron Man, The Incredible Hulk, Iron Man 2, Thor, Captain America: The First Avenger, and The Angry Birds Movie. At the helm of Livent, Maisel won the Tony Award for Best Musical for the Broadway production, Fosse.

Early life

David Maisel was raised in Saratoga Springs, New York. He graduated from Duke University and then earned an MBA from Harvard University. His first job was with Boston Consulting Group where he advised entertainment companies.

Career
Maisel joined Creative Artists Agency in 1994 as a corporate advisory agent working with Michael Ovitz, the agency's founder and CEO. Maisel assisted in Matsushita’s sale of entertainment conglomerate MCA/Universal to Seagram in 1995. When Ovitz joined Walt Disney Company as president in 1995, the company also added Maisel as its Director of Corporate Development and Strategic Planning. When Ovitz left Disney he invited Maisel to plan his next venture. Ovitz acquired a minority stake in the largest publicly traded live-theater company, Livent, and named Maisel President. While at Livent, Maisel produced the Broadway show, Fosse, which won a Tony Award for Best Musical in 1999. Maisel restructured the company and then engineered the sale of Livent to SFX in 1999 for $100 to $110 million. 
 
From 1999 to 2001, Maisel was Managing Director of chello, Europe’s largest broadband-service provider. In 2001, Maisel joined Endeavor Talent Agency to lead its corporate strategy and business development efforts.

Marvel Studios

In 2003, Maisel pitched Marvel Studios’ CEO and Chairman, Avi Arad and then pitched CEO, Isaac Perlmutter, on his idea of Marvel financing and producing its own movies in a connected cinematic universe. Perlmutter hired Maisel as Marvel Studios’ President. To execute his plan, Maisel engineered a slate-structure financing to total $525 million. 
 
In 2005, Maisel was promoted to Vice Chairman of Marvel Studios and, in 2006, Maisel was also elevated to the Office of the CEO of Marvel Entertainment. Maisel was promoted to Marvel Studios’ Chairman in 2007 and oversaw the launch of the first Iron Man franchise film in 2008. In 2009, Maisel arranged the sale of Marvel to Disney for $4 billion. In 2015, Marvel and Disney recognized and thanked Maisel as the Founding Chairman of Marvel Studios in the credits of Avengers: Age of Ultron.

Post-Marvel
In July 2011, Maisel was hired by Rovio Entertainment to lead its efforts to make an Angry Birds movie as Special Advisor and Executive Producer of The Angry Birds Movie. The film hit #1 for its opening weekend in May 2016 and grossed $350 million in worldwide box office receipts.

In 2018, The New York Times reported that Maisel partnered with Scooter Braun to launch Mythos Studios, which acquired half of Aspen Comics. Along with its stake, Mythos holds the entertainment rights to Aspen's properties including the Fathom and Soulfire comic book series, both of which are in development at Mythos. In June 2018, Mythos announced an additional animated film about mythological god, Cupid, starring Justin Bieber as voice talent. Cupid is one film in a cinematic universe, termed Mythos Studios' "MythoVerse".

Filmography

References

External links

American chief executives
American chief operating officers
American film producers
American film studio executives
American theatre managers and producers
Duke University alumni
Film producers from California
Harvard Business School alumni
Living people
Marvel Studios people
Year of birth missing (living people)